Chavar District is a district (bakhsh) in Ilam County, Ilam Province, Iran. At the 2006 census, its population was 11,860, in 2,378 families.  The District has one city: Chavar.  The District has two rural districts (dehestan): Arkavazi Rural District and Boli Rural District.

References 

Districts of Ilam Province
Ilam County